The Michael E. Krauss Alaska Native Language Archive (ANLA) in Fairbanks, Alaska, is an extensive repository for manuscripts and recordings documenting the Native Languages of Alaska. The Archive was created as part of the Alaska Native Language Center by state legislation  in 1972. In 2009 the Archive was administratively separated and now exists as a sister organization to the Alaska Native Language Center, collaborating on numerous language efforts in Alaska.

ANLA is part of the Alaska & Polar Regions Special Collections and Archives at the University of Alaska Fairbanks Rasmuson Library. It was officially renamed in honor of Michael E. Krauss at a dedication ceremony on February 22, 2013. ANLA is a member of the Open Language Archives Community and the Digital Endangered Languages and Musics Archiving Network.

Dr. Siri Tuttle was appointed Director of ANLA in 2016.

See also
Alaska Native Language Center
Alaska Native languages

References

External links
Alaska Native Language Archive
Digital Endangered Languages and Musics Archiving Network (DELAMAN)

Alaska Native culture in Fairbanks
Linguistic research institutes
Indigenous languages of Alaska
University of Alaska Fairbanks
Archives in the United States
1972 establishments in Alaska